Nariman is a village in Kara-Suu District of Osh Region of Kyrgyzstan. Its population was 12,021 in 2021.

Population

References

Populated places in Osh Region